The 1959 Sicilian regional election took place on 7 June 1959.

Christian Democracy was by far the largest party, largely ahead of the Italian Communist Party. After the election Silvio Milazzo, leader of the Social Christian Sicilian Union and incumbent President, formed a new government that included the Italian Communist Party, the Italian Social Movement and the Italian Democratic Party.

The coalition, albeit with some minor changes, continued to lead the Region under Benedetto Majorana della Nicchiara (1960–1961) and was finally replaced by a coalition including the official Christian Democracy and the Socialists in 1961 (organic Centre-left), under President Giuseppe D'Angelo, a Christian Democrat.

Results
Electoral system: proportional representation

Sources: Istituto Cattaneo and Sicilian Regional Assembly

References

Elections in Sicily
Sicilian regional election
Sicilian regional election